Pål Haugen Lillefosse (born 4 June 2001) is a Norwegian athlete specialising in the pole vault. He won a gold medal at the 2019 European U20 Championships.

His personal bests are 5.86 metres outdoors (Stjørdal 2022) and 5.83 metres indoors (Uppsala 2022).

International competitions

References

2001 births
Living people
Sportspeople from Bergen
Norwegian male pole vaulters
European Athletics Championships medalists
21st-century Norwegian people